Inessa Lisovskaya (also Lissovskaya; ; (born 1964) is a retired Soviet individual rhythmic gymnast. She won a silver medal in the team exercise at the 1981 World Championships in Munich and three bronze medals at the 1980 European Championships in Amsterdam.

References

1964 births
Living people
Soviet rhythmic gymnasts
Belarusian rhythmic gymnasts
Gymnasts from Minsk
Medalists at the Rhythmic Gymnastics World Championships